The 1996–97 season was the 73rd season in the existence of AEK Athens F.C. and the 38th consecutive season in the top flight of Greek football. They competed in the Alpha Ethniki, the Greek Cup, the Greek Super Cup and the UEFA Cup Winners' Cup. The season began on 11 August 1996 and finished on 25 May 1997.

Overview
A very important season for AEK Athens, since for the first time after 8 years the club was called to play without their coach-leader for the previous years, Dušan Bajević, after his move to Olympiacos. AEK played very good football, won the Cup again, has a very good European presence, but in the league it was again in second place, this time behind the team of their former coach. In the summer of 1996, with Bajević gone, Michalis Trochanas anointed his until then assistant and former player of AEK, Petros Ravousis, as his successor. At the same time, the major shareholder of AEK decided to sell last year's top scorer of the team and the league, Vasilios Tsiartas, to Sevilla, while the contract of Refik Šabanadžović was expired and he followed with Bajević to Olympiacos as well. Dimitris Saravakos also left and Spyros Ikonomopoulos ended his career after 19 years of presence at the club. On the other hand, the team acquires the rising star, Demis Nikolaidis, while also making some more useful transfers.

On 17 August, AEK played for the Super Cup against Panathinaikos. The yellow-blacks took the lead at the 88th minute with Savevski, but they were equalized in the 90th minute by Alexoudis and the match went to extra time. Michalis Vlachos was sent off between the 2 goals and AEK played with 10 players for the rest of the match. The score remained in extra time and the match went to the penalty shoot-out. After many penalties were taken, AEK were the eventual winners, with 8–9 and Kopitsis scoring for a second time from the spot.

The team was in "acquired speed" from the previous season, they played very good football and again, they had the best attack in the league, but they finished in second place. However, both AEK and most of the teams in the league have very strong complaints about the treatment of Olympiacos had received from the referees throughout the season, since at that time we also have the beginning of the well-known "shack" of Greek football. By far the most important moment of the season was the return of Bajević to Nea Filadelfeia on 13 January. The stadium was packed again, the match went on as usual and the AEK fans created an incredible atmosphere of hatred and thirst for revenge against their former favorite Bosnian coach. Banknotes with the image of Bajević were falling on the coach of Olympiacos, abusive slogans, insulting banners, composed a very strongly electrified atmosphere. Finally, in a match where the players of AEK "deposited their souls" and the crowd was the "twelfth player", AEK won in the muddy pitch with 2–0. Biggest victories of the season for the championship were the 0–7 against Athinaikos, the 6–1 against Iraklis, Kalamata and Athinaikos once again. Towards the end of the season, Michalis Trochanas createed new problems with his announcements, since he went against Ravousis due to the exclusion of the team in Europe and the football department was once again a mess resulting in the latter's departure at the end of the seasons.

In the UEFA Cup Winners' Cup, AEK were still redeeming their return to the elite of European football with good draws. This time, their opponent was the Slovakian Chemlon Humenné. The first match in Athens ended with the fluid 1–0 and qualification remained open. The rematch in the weather-heavy Humenné started in the worst possible way, as the Slovaks in their first attack scored after 19 seconds and everything showed to another very tense European game by AEK. However, the capacity difference was so great and as soon as AEK overcame the shock of goal, the qualification case ended with quick procedures as they complete the comeback by the end of the first half. In the second round, AEK came across Olimpija Ljubljana. Ravousis made it clear to the players that this time there was no place for underestimation and indifference and AEK presented themselves extremely serious at the Bežigrad Stadium winning with 0–2 and finishing the qualification. The Slovenians step on the pitch of Nea Filadelfeia and for the first time in their career face a fanatical crowed that pushed AEK into the spectacle and end up losing with the 4–0, despite defending massively. AEK advanced to the third round and participated in the March draw where the major European clubs were present. Paris was painted yellow and black as the draw brought the title holder, Paris Saint-Germain as the opponent of AEK and 5,000 Greeks rushed to the Parc des Princes to support AEK. Michel Platini was commentating on the pitch, who along with 40,000 French people, was watching the two stands of the Greeks who create an amazing atmosphere. AEK presented with defensive orientations and Manolas, perhaps in his last big game with, AEK kept and even loses chances on the counter, since the French are impossible to hold Ketsbaia and Batista. The game ended scoreless, and during the following 15 days, everyone's mind was on the rematch in Athens. Nikos Goumas Stadium was suffocating two hours before the game on 20 March, AEK entered the match offensively and pressed for a goal. In the 21st minute, the referee did not whistle Loko's foul on Vlachos and the Frenchman was unmarked and scored. AEK tried to react, their audience continued to push them relentlessly, but the goal did not come and instead came the second goal for Paris, again with Loko, just before half-time. The qualification was, AEK were doing everything they could to avoid defeat and with Ravousis' desperate attempt to get something good from the match was left very exposed at the back, as a result of which conceded a third goal, again from Patris Loko, ten minutes before the final whistle.

For the Cup, AEK first went through the first round without a match and then very easily eliminated Skoda Xanthi. Then, had an easy task against the ILTEX Lykoi, which he confirmed on the pitch. In the quarter-finals, they played against Paniliakos, beating him in Nikos Goumas Stadium with 3–1, while easily defeating him in Pyrgos Stadium with 0–2. In the semi-finals, AEK faced Olympiacos of Bajević, who returned to Nea Filadelfeia for the second time within a month! The "welcoming" of the Bosnian and Olympiacos was again very heated, AEK again played an incredibly spirited match and led with 2 goals. However, Olympiacos re-entered the qualification game, after a goal by Alexandris in stoppage time. In the rematch in Piraeus, Olympiacos pressed, AEK defendd properly and in a nice counterattack in the 47th minute, Ketsbaia made a huge distance with the ball at his feet and finally gave an open goal to Nikolaidis who did not miss the chance to score. The yellow-blacks then keep the score and advance, although again they play with fewer players due to the dismissal of Manolas. Thus, AEK advanced to the final of the competition for the fourth season in a row. The match took place on April 16 at the Karaiskakis Stadium, in a particularly nervous game which ended without goals both in regular time and in extra time. In the penalty shoot-out, AEK finally got the big victory and the trophy with Atmatsidis as their protagonist, who also scored the last penalty of AEK.

Top scorer of the season for the team was Christos Kostis with 21 goals, while Demis Nikolaidis scored 19 goals. Apart from these two players, Ketsbaia, Manolas, Savevski, Batista, Atmatsidis, Kasapis and Borbokis had also an excellent performance.

Players

Squad information

NOTE: The players are the ones that have been announced by the AEK Athens' press release. No edits should be made unless a player arrival or exit is announced. Updated 30 June 1997, 23:59 UTC+3.

Transfers

In

Summer

 a.  plus Pantelis Konstantinidis.

Out

Summer

Winter

Loan out

Summer

Renewals

Overall transfer activity

Expenditure
Summer:  ₯288,000,000

Winter:  ₯0

Total:  ₯288,000,000

Income
Summer:  ₯500,000,000

Winter:  ₯0

Total:  ₯500,000,000

Net Totals
Summer:  ₯212,000,000

Winter:  ₯0

Total:  ₯212,000,000

Pre-season and friendlies

Greek Super Cup

Alpha Ethniki

League table

Results summary

Results by Matchday

Fixtures

Greek Cup

AEK Athens entered the Greek Cup at the third round.

Round of 32

Round of 16

Quarter-finals

Semi-finals

Final

UEFA Cup Winners' Cup

First round

Second round

Quarter-finals

Statistics

Squad statistics

! colspan="13" style="background:#FFDE00; text-align:center" | Goalkeepers
|-

! colspan="13" style="background:#FFDE00; color:black; text-align:center;"| Defenders
|-

! colspan="13" style="background:#FFDE00; color:black; text-align:center;"| Midfielders
|-

! colspan="13" style="background:#FFDE00; color:black; text-align:center;"| Forwards
|-

! colspan="13" style="background:#FFDE00; color:black; text-align:center;"| Left during Winter Transfer Window
|-

|-
|}

Disciplinary record

|-
! colspan="20" style="background:#FFDE00; text-align:center" | Goalkeepers

|-
! colspan="20" style="background:#FFDE00; color:black; text-align:center;"| Defenders

|-
! colspan="20" style="background:#FFDE00; color:black; text-align:center;"| Midfielders

|-
! colspan="20" style="background:#FFDE00; color:black; text-align:center;"| Forwards

|-
! colspan="20" style="background:#FFDE00; color:black; text-align:center;"| Left during Winter Transfer window

|-
|}

Starting 11

References

External links
AEK Athens F.C. Official Website

AEK Athens F.C. seasons
AEK Athens